Dario Colombi (3 June 1929 – 12 May 2010) was an Italian bobsledder who competed in the early 1950s. At the 1952 Winter Olympics, he finished tenth both in the two-man and in the four-man events.

References

External links
 
1952 bobsleigh two-man results
1952 bobsleigh four-man results

1929 births
2010 deaths
Bobsledders at the 1952 Winter Olympics
Italian male bobsledders
Olympic bobsledders of Italy